Yerevan City Council elections were held on May 31, 2009. All 65 seats were contested.

This was the first election to the City Council of Yerevan, capital of Armenia.

|-style="background:#E9E9E9;"
|colspan=2 style="text-align:center;" | Party
| style="text-align:center;" | Votes
| style="text-align:center;" | %
| style="text-align:center;" | Seats
|-
| 
| style="text-align:center;" | 186,630
| style="text-align:center;" | 47.43%
| style="text-align:center;" | 35
|-
| 
| style="text-align:center;" | 89,131
| style="text-align:center;" | 22.65%
| style="text-align:center;" | 17
|-
| 
| style="text-align:center;" | 69,140
| style="text-align:center;" | 17.57%
| style="text-align:center;" | 13
|-
| 
| style="text-align:left;" |Rule of Law
| style="text-align:center;" | 20,106
| style="text-align:center;" | 5.11%
| style="text-align:center;" | 
|-
| 
| style="text-align:left;" |ARF
| style="text-align:center;" | 18,094
| style="text-align:center;" | 4.60%
| style="text-align:center;" | 
|-
| 
| style="text-align:left;" |People's Party
| style="text-align:center;" | 8,479
| style="text-align:center;" | 2.15%
| style="text-align:center;" | 
|-
| 
| style="text-align:left;" |Socialist Workers Party of Armenia
| style="text-align:center;" | 1,936
| style="text-align:center;" | 0.49%
| style="text-align:center;" | 
|-
| colspan=2 | Invalid votes
| style="text-align:center;" | 10,479
| style="text-align:center;" | 
| style="text-align:center;" | —
|-
! colspan=2 | Total
| style="text-align:center;" | 404,634
| style="text-align:center;" | 100.00%
| style="text-align:center;" | 65
|-
| style="text-align:left;" colspan=5 |Source: Central Electoral Commission of Armenia
|}

References

Yerevan City Council election
2009 Yerevan City Council
Yerevan City Council election
City council elections
Yerevan City Council election
21st century in Yerevan